This article lists political parties in Asturias.

Asturias has a multi-party system at both the national and regional level. There are five political parties with representation in the General Junta of the Principality of Asturias, (the communist IU–IX, progressive Podemos, moderate FSA–PSOE, liberal Ciudadanos, regionalist FAC and conservative PP) which makes it extremely difficult for any other formation or coalition to achieve an electoral majority in the parliament.

Most voted political parties in the 2019 Asturian parliamentary election

Political parties running for the Asturian general election, 2019

 Animalist Party Against Mistreatment of Animals
Equo
Andecha Astur
Communist Party of the Workers of Spain

Other active political parties
Only parties with article at Wikipedia are included in this section.

Asturian Left
Asturian Renewal Union
Communist Party of Asturias
Commitment for Asturias
Conceyu Abiertu
Partíu Asturianista
Unidá

References

Asturias